The 2012 División Intermedia season (officially the 2012 Copa TIGO- Visión Banco for sponsorship reasons) was the 16th season of semi-professional football in Paraguay. In this season, were added 2 teams more to the championship, and added average points for relegation.

It began on March 17 and ended on October 14.

Teams

Standings

Relegation
Relegations is determined at the end of the season by computing an average (Spanish: promedio) of the number of points earned per game over the past three seasons. The three teams with the lowest average is relegated.

Pos: Position, Avg: Average, Total Pts: Total Points, Total Pld: Total Played

Top goalscorers
 Christian López (17 goals) from Deportivo Capiatá

Para2
2